The consensus 1959 College Basketball All-American team, as determined by aggregating the results of five major All-American teams.  To earn "consensus" status, a player must win honors from a majority of the following teams: the Associated Press, the USBWA, The United Press International, the National Association of Basketball Coaches, and the Newspaper Enterprise Association (NEA).

1959 Consensus All-America team

Individual All-America teams

AP Honorable Mention:

 Bob Anderegg, Michigan State
 Bob Ayersman, Virginia Tech
 Carl Belz, Princeton
 Ed Blair, Western Michigan
 Bill Bridges, Kansas
 Charlie Brown, Seattle
 M. C. Burton, Michigan
 Arlen Clark, Oklahoma State
 Ralph Davis, Cincinnati
 LaRoy Doss, Saint Mary's
 Johnny Egan, Providence
 Red Frederick, Auburn
 Dave Gunther, Iowa
 Lee Harman, Oregon State
 Jim Henry, Vanderbilt
 Dick Hickox, Miami (Florida)
 Leon Hill, Texas Tech
 Darrall Imhoff, California
 Tony Jackson, St. John's
 H. E. Kirchner, Texas Christian
 Roy Lange, William & Mary
 Rudy LaRusso, Dartmouth
 Walt Mangham, Marquette
 Bobby Joe Mason, Bradley
 Don Matuszak, Kansas State
 Charlie McNeil, Maryland
 Bucky McDonald, George Washington
 Willie Merriweather, Purdue
 Doug Moe, North Carolina
 Paul Neumann, Stanford
 Pearl Pollard, Utah
 John Richter, North Carolina State
 Gerry Schroeder, Colorado
 Al Seiden, St. John's
 Lee Shaffer, North Carolina
 Doug Smart, Washington
 Bob Smith, West Virginia
 Tom Stith, St. Bonaventure
 Gene Tormohlen, Tennessee
 Walt Torrence, UCLA
 Wilbur Trosch, Saint Francis (PA)
 Tony Windis, Wyoming
 Leroy Wright, Pacific

See also
 1958–59 NCAA University Division men's basketball season

References

NCAA Men's Basketball All-Americans
All-Americans